Address Unknown is a short novel by Kathrine Taylor in 1938. Taylor describes and predicts Germany's political and social situation in 1930s. The story is told entirely in letters between two German friends from 1932 to 1934.

Adaptations 
The novel was adapted into a film of the same name in 1944, was performed as a stage play in France, 2001, in Israel from 2002 (where it still runs) and at the Promenade Theater in New York in 2004. It has also been performed in Germany, Italy, Turkey, Argentina, South Africa and in various other US cities. Address Unknown (Cimzett Ismeretlen) premiered on the stage of Spinoza Haz in Budapest, Hungary on September 6, 2008 and was performed in the Tron Theatre Glasgow as part of the Mayfesto season from 15 to 22 May 2010. It was performed at the Koninklijke Schouwburg in the Hague in the Netherlands in May 2011. In 2013 it was brought to the Soho Theatre in London. At the Copenhagen Royal Theatre in 2019 and 2020 it was performed by Søren Sætter Lassen and Lars Mikkelsen and followed by a debate and discussion on how Denmark acted towards Nazi Germany before the war. An adaptation for BBC Radio 4 was broadcast in June 2008 as an Afternoon Play. It starred Henry Goodman as Max and Patrick Malahide as Martin and was adapted and directed by Tim Dee.

Publication 
Story magazine published Address Unknown in 1938. The editor Whit Burnett and husband Elliot deemed the story "too strong to appear under the name of a woman," and published the work under the name Kressmann Taylor, dropping her first name. She used this name professionally for the rest of her life. Reader's Digest soon reprinted the novel, and Simon & Schuster published it as a book in 1939, selling 50,000 copies. Foreign publications followed quickly, including a Dutch translation, later confiscated by Nazis, and a German one, published in Moscow. The book was banned in Germany.

The book's afterword, written by Taylor's son, reveals that the idea for the story came from a small news article: American students in Germany wrote home with the truth about the Nazi atrocities, a truth most Americans, including Charles Lindbergh, would not accept. Fraternity brothers thought it would be funny to send them letters making fun of Hitler, and the visiting students wrote back, "Stop it. We’re in danger. These people don’t fool around. You could murder [someone] by writing letters to him." Thus emerged the idea of "letter as weapon" or "murder by mail."

Aftermath 
In 1995, when Taylor was 91, Story Press reissued Address Unknown to mark the 50th anniversary of the liberation of the concentration camps. The story was subsequently translated into 20 languages, with the French version selling 600,000 copies. The book finally appeared in Germany in 2001, and was reissued in Britain in 2002. In Israel, the Hebrew edition was a best-seller and was adapted for the stage. There has already been over 100 performances of the stage show, and it was filmed for TV and broadcast on the occasion of Holocaust Memorial Day, January 27. Rediscovered after Address Unknown'''s reissue, Taylor spent a final year signing copies and giving interviews until her death at age 93.

 Plot 
Martin, a Gentile, returns with his family to Germany, exhilarated by the advances in the old country since the humiliation of the Great War. His business partner, Max, a Jew, remains in the States to keep the business going. The story is told entirely in letters between them, from 1932 to 1934.

Martin writes about the "wonderful" Third Reich and a man named "Hitler." At first Max is covetous: "How I envy you! ... You go to a democratic Germany, a land with a deep culture and the beginnings of a fine political freedom." Max soon however has misgivings about his friend's new enthusiasms, having heard from eyewitnesses who had gotten out of Berlin that Jews were being beaten and their businesses boycotted. Martin responds, telling Max that, while they may be good friends, everybody knows that Jews have been the universal scapegoats, and "a few must suffer for the millions to be saved."

"This Jew trouble is only an incident," Martin writes. "Something bigger is happening." Nonetheless, he asks Max to stop writing to him. If a letter were intercepted, he (Martin) would lose his official position and he and his family would be endangered.

Max continues to write regardless, when his own sister, Griselle, an actress goes to Berlin and goes missing. He becomes frantic to learn her fate. Martin responds on bank stationery (less likely to be inspected) and tells Max his sister is dead. He admits that he turned Griselle away when she came to him, her brother's dearest friend, for sanctuary – she had foolishly defied the Nazis and was being pursued by SA thugs. (It is implied earlier in the book that Martin and Griselle had had an affair before the events of the book take place.)

After a gap of about a month, Max starts writing to Martin at home, carrying only what looks like business and remarks about the weather, but writing as though they have a hidden encoded meaning, with strange references to exact dimensions of pictures and so on. The letters refer to "our grandmother" and imply that Martin is also Jewish. The letters from Munich to San Francisco get shorter and more panicky, begging Max to stop: "My God, Max, do you know what you do? ... These letters you have sent ... are not delivered, but they bring me in and ... demand I give them the code ... I beg you, Max, no more, no more! Stop while I can be saved."

Max however continues, "Prepare these for distribution by March 24th: Rubens 12 by 77, blue; Giotto 1 by 317, green and white; Poussin 20 by 90, red and white." The letter is returned to Max, stamped: Adressat unbekannt. Addressee Unknown. (The title of the book is actually a mistranslation of Adressat unbekannt:''  The correct translation of "Adressat" is "addressee," not "address"; which is much more in keeping with the plot of the story.)

References

External links 
complete text of Address Unknown
The Guardian: Address Unknown: the great, forgotten anti-Nazi book everyone must read

1938 American novels
Novels set in the 1930s
American novels adapted into films
American novels adapted into plays
Censored books